Disneymania, also known as Disneymania 1, is the first installment in the Disneymania album series presenting songs from Disney films, performed by various musical artists. Released on September 17, 2002, the album was considered a commercial success, and achieved Gold certification from the RIAA in February 2003, despite peaking at 52nd place on the Billboard 200. Singles released from the album were "I Wanna Be Like You" by Smash Mouth, "Beauty and the Beast" by Jump5, and "Reflection" by Christina Aguilera (the film's soundtrack was released four years before the album).

Track listing

• ^ Bonus German & Japanese Track

Charts

Critical reception
Allmusic gave the album a rating of 3 out of 5 stars, noting "some of pop's biggest names have been handed over music from numerous Disney flicks (with most of the emphasis being on '80s and '90s fare), and then asked to give them totally new makeovers". It described the interpretations as "infusing a light trip-hop beat", "bouncy", "beeping electronics", "soulful", "pumping in beats", "a cappella", "'Footloose'-like spin", "understated", and "measured".

Singles
"Reflection" - Christina Aguilera
"Beauty and the Beast" - Jump5 (released to promote Beauty and the Beast Platinum Edition)
"Colors of the Wind" - Ashanti & Lil'Sis Shi Shi
"I Wanna Be Like You" - Smash Mouth (released to promote The Jungle Book 2. It is also played during the film's end credits)

Music videos
"I Wanna Be Like You" - Smash Mouth
"Reflection" - Christina Aguilera
"Beauty and the Beast" - Jump5
"Colors of the Wind" - Ashanti featuring Lil' Sis Shi Shi
"You'll Be in My Heart" - Usher

References

External links
 

Disneymania albums
Walt Disney Records compilation albums
2002 compilation albums